Gordon Cameron may refer to:

 William Gordon Cameron (1827–1913), British soldier and colonial administrator
 Gordon Robertson Cameron (1921–2010), businessman and political figure in the Yukon, Canada
 Gordon Cameron (footballer) (1922–1995), Australian rules footballer
 Gordon Cameron (economist) (1937–1990), British land economist and master of Fitzwilliam College, Cambridge

See also
 Cameron Gordon (disambiguation)